The JPM 03 Loiret is a French amateur-built aircraft that was designed by Jean-Pierre Marie and produced by Avions Jean-Pierre Marie (JPM) of Le Mesnil-Esnard. The aircraft is a development of the JPM 01 Médoc and is supplied as plans for amateur construction.

The aircraft is named for the French community of Loiret.

Design and development
The Loiret features a cantilever low wing, a two-seats-in-side-by-side configuration enclosed cockpit under a bubble canopy, fixed tricycle landing gear with wheel pants and a single engine in tractor configuration.

The aircraft is made from wood with its flying surfaces covered in doped aircraft fabric. The Loiret was designed specifically to use only the  Jabiru 2200 four-stroke powerplant.

The aircraft can be built with a single-piece wing or a three-piece folding wing.

Specifications (JPM 03 Loiret)

References

External links

Official photos of the JPM 03 Loiret

Homebuilt aircraft
Single-engined tractor aircraft
Avions Jean-Pierre Marie aircraft